The following lists events that happened during 1996 in Armenia.

Incumbents
 President: Levon Ter-Petrosyan
 Prime Minister: Hrant Bagratyan (until 4 November), Armen Sarkissian (starting 4 November)
 Speaker: Babken Ararktsyan

Events

March
 March 1–8: The first leg and the second leg of the 1995–96 Armenian Cup were played.

July
 July 19 - Armenia takes part in the Summer Olympic Games for the first time as an independent nation.

August
 August 16–25: Five athletes from Armenia competed at the 1996 Summer Paralympics.

September
 September 15: The 32nd Chess Olympiad is opened in Yerevan.
 September 21: A military parade in honour of the 5th anniversary of Armenia's independence was held on the Republic Square.
 September 22: Levon Ter-Petrosyan wins the presidential elections in Armenia.

Establishments
 Armavia
 Miss Armenia

Disestablishments
 FC Yeghvard

References

 
1990s in Armenia
Years of the 20th century in Armenia
Armenia
Armenia
Armenia